Min Taya Medaw was a principal queen of King Nanda of Toungoo Dynasty of Burma (Myanmar) from 1581 to 1599. Nanda was her first cousin. The queen was described in a well-known eigyin-style poem/song by the famous poet Nawaday, who served at the Prome court. She and the king had no children.

After Nanda lost power in 1599, she spent ten years in Toungoo in exile until 1610. On , King Anaukpetlun, who had just defeated Natshinnaung, the self-proclaimed king of Toungoo, ordered that the queen, Min Htwe, and Natshin Medaw be sent to Ava (Inwa) with the full royal regalia befitting their former status.

Ancestry
From her mother's side, she was descended from Ava and Prome royal lines. She was the younger daughter of Thado Dhamma Yaza II, Viceroy of Prome, and a niece of King Bayinnaung.

Notes

References

Bibliography
 
 
 

Chief queens consort of Toungoo dynasty
1550s births
Year of death unknown
16th-century Burmese women
17th-century Burmese women